Talkhis al-Adilla li-Qawa'id al-Tawhid is a Sunni theological treatise on the Hanafi scholastic speculative theology (kalam), written by the Maturidi theologian al-Saffar al-Bukhari (d. 534/1139) as a defence of Sunni teachings against heretics, such as the Karramites (Karrāmiyya), Kharijites (Khawarij), Qadarites (Qadariyya), and Jahmites (Jahmiyya).

Content 
Al-Saffar explains many issues, particularly those related to the existence, oneness and attributes of Allah, based on more than 175 Divine Names of God (al-asma' al-husna).

Notes

See also 
 Tabsirat al-Adilla
 Kitab al-Tawhid
 Al-Sawad al-A'zam
 List of Sunni books

Further reading

References

External links 
 The Understanding of Kalām Based on al-Asmāʾ al-Husnā: The Case of Abū Isḥāq al-Ṣaffār
 Talkhis al-Adilla by as-Ṣaffār al-Bukhārī (ed. by Angelika Brodersen) on Academia.edu
 Māturīdī Theologian Abū Ishāq al-Zāhid al-Saffār’s Vindication of the Kalām on Academia.edu
 Talkhis al-Adilla on Goodreads
 Talkhis al-Adilla on QuranicThought.com

Maturidi literature
Sunni literature
Islamic theology books
Kalam
Names of God in Islam